The Russia men's national under-18 and under-19 basketball team is a national basketball team of Russia, administered by the Russian Basketball Federation. It represented the country in international men's under-16 and under-17 basketball competitions.

After the 2022 Russian invasion of Ukraine, FIBA banned Russian teams and officials from participating in FIBA basketball competitions.

FIBA U18 European Championship participations

FIBA Under-19 Basketball World Cup participations

See also
Russia men's national basketball team
Russia men's national under-17 basketball team
Soviet Union men's national under-19 basketball team
Russia women's national under-19 basketball team

References

External links
Archived records of Russia team participations

Basketball in Russia
u19
Basketball
Men's national under-19 basketball teams